is a 1985 Japanese animated epic space opera film. It is a feature-length Doraemon film which premiered in Japan on March 16, 1985. As the film's title suggests, it is a parody of George Lucas' original Star Wars trilogy, with a few elements from his 1983 film Return of the Jedi. The film is directed by Tsutomu Shibayama. The theme song of this film is performed by Tetsuya Takeda. It's the 6th Doraemon film. The remake of the film, Doraemon: Nobita's Little Star Wars 2021 has been released on 4 March 2022 after being postponed from its original 5 March 2021 release date due to the COVID-19 pandemic.

Plot
The film begins with a prologue of a battle on a faraway planet, where the president is evacuated on a rocket. The film shifts to the Earth, where Nobita is kicked out by Gian and Suneo after destroying the set of the space movie they are making. Nobita runs to Doraemon and the two recruit Shizuka to make their own film.

During filming, Nobita finds what looks like a toy rocket. Later that night, Nobita and Doraemon discover a tiny smart humanoid alien Papi in their room. Papi explains that there is a dangerous enemy searching for him. Nobita, Doraemon and Shizuka assure him that he will be safe in their home, and they play together using Doraemon's Small Light to shrink themselves to Papi's size.

Meanwhile, a whale-shaped spaceship destroys Suneo's new set and Suneo and Gian confronts Nobita at his house, but Papi explains that it was a battleship sent by PCIA to find him. He reveals that he is the president of his planet Pirika, which has been taken over by the dictator Gilmore. PCIA is the dictator's intelligence agency, and they have been sent to capture Papi to ensure Gilmore's total victory.

Nobita and friends hide Papi in a secret base made by one of Doraemon's gadget at Shizuka's home. The PCIA battleship manages to infiltrate the base and kidnaps Shizuka, as well as steal the Small Light and prevent the children from returning to their normal size. Dorakoruru, the head of PCIA, leaves a message demanding Papi in exchange for Shizuka's freedom. Papi leaves alone to surrender in while the children rewire Suneo's model tanks for flight and combat. Papi's pet dog Rokoroko arrives, but is too late to save him. The dog and Shizuka return to the others, and together they plan to travel to Pirika using the same rocket in which Papi came to Earth.

At Pirika, Nobita and friends arrive at a secret base located in the planet's ring. Army chief Genbu explains that Papi is being held in PCIA's head office, facing a death sentence. Doraemon, Nobita and Gian head to the planet with Rokoroko, while Shizuka and Suneo remain to defend the base from the PCIA space force. Nobita and friends meet with a resistance group, but are soon captured by PCIA soldiers after being traced down by Gilmore's cameras. After heading to the planet's surface in their tanks, Shizuka and Suneo are shot down as well. While their tanks sink into the ocean, Shizuka suddenly starts returning to her normal size.

At PCIA headquarters, Nobita, Doraemon, Gian, Papi and Rokoroko are about to be executed by firing squad, but suddenly Dorakoruru receives news that giant Earthlings have been spotted. After realizing that the Small Light's effect have expired, Nobita and friends return to their normal size as well and reunite with Shizuka and Suneo. Together with their Pirika allies, they battle with the PCIA forces. Dorakoruru attacks them in his battleship, but Gian single-handedly takes it down and causes it to crash into the ocean. Meanwhile, Gilmore attempts to flee but is stopped by every citizen of Pirika rallied together, causing him to surrender.

Nobita and his friends say goodbye to the residents of Pirika and head back to Earth. On the way, they talk about going back to visit Pirika again the next week. The ending credit show snippets of their later visits.

Cast
An English version produced and released exclusively in Malaysia by Speedy Video, features an unknown voice cast.

Production
TBA

Reception
TBA

References

External links
Doraemon The Movie 25th page 

1985 films
1985 anime films
Animated films about extraterrestrial life
Nobita's Little Star Wars
Films directed by Tsutomu Shibayama
Films scored by Shunsuke Kikuchi
Films set on fictional planets
1980s Japanese-language films
Parody films based on Star Wars